Sebastian Mwange (born 18 December 1991) is a Zambian footballer who plays as a goalkeeper for Green Eagles F.C. and the Zambia national football team.

Honours

Individual
COSAFA Cup Golden Glove: 2019

References

External links

1991 births
Living people
Zambian footballers
Zambia international footballers
Nchanga Rangers F.C. players
Roan United F.C. players
National Assembly F.C. players
Green Eagles F.C. players
Association football goalkeepers
Zambia Super League players